Shihgang Dam is a concrete gravity barrage dam across the Dajia River in Shigang District and Dongshi District of Taichung, Taiwan, located near Fengyuan District.

The dam was heavily damaged in the 921 earthquake of 1999, which caused the collapse of its northern end. Subsequently, an embankment cofferdam was built to prevent water from flowing through the breach, while the collapsed section has been retained as a memorial. Since this reduces the storage capacity of the dam, it is no longer used for flood control, but remains an important source of agricultural water.

See also 
 List of dams and reservoirs in Taiwan

References 

1977 establishments in Taiwan
Dams in Taichung
Dams completed in 1977
Dam failures in Asia
Gravity dams
1999 Jiji earthquake
Man-made disasters in Taiwan